Bodaybinsky District is an administrative district, one of the thirty-three in Irkutsk Oblast, Russia. Municipally, it is incorporated as Bodaybinsky Municipal District. Its administrative center is the town of Bodaybo. Population:  10,817 (2002 Census);

Geography 
It is located in the Patom Highlands, in the northeastern zone of the oblast. The Zhuya river cuts across the district and the Bolshoy Patom flows in a wide arch to the west and to the north. Besides Bodaybo, some of the settlements of the district are Aprilsk, Artyomovsky, Balakhninsky, Kropotkin, Mamakan, Svetly, Vasilievsky, Perevoz and Bolshoy Patom.

Administrative and municipal status
Within the framework of administrative divisions, Bodaybinsky District is one of the thirty-three in the oblast. The town of Bodaybo serves as its administrative center.

As a municipal division, the district is incorporated as Bodaybinsky Municipal District.

See also
 Lena Plateau

References

Notes

Sources

Registry of the Administrative-Territorial Formations of Irkutsk Oblast 

Districts of Irkutsk Oblast
